"I Was the One" is a song by Elvis Presley, written by Aaron Schroeder, Bill Peppers, Claude Demetrius and Hal Blair.

Presley recorded it at RCA's Studios, Nashville, on January 11, 1956. It was released as the B-side of the "Heartbreak Hotel" single (RCA Victor 20-6420 (78 rpm record) and RCA Victor 47-6420 (single)) in 1956, and was produced by Steve Sholes.

Other versions
Swedish band Streaplers has also recorded the song. It was released on the LP Speed (Bohus Bglp 5010) in 1978.
Country musician Jimmie Dale Gilmore also recorded a version on his album, Spinning Around the Sun.

References

1956 singles
Elvis Presley songs
1956 songs
Songs written by Aaron Schroeder
Songs written by Claude Demetrius
Song recordings produced by Stephen H. Sholes
Songs written by Hal Blair